Kunio David Lemari (29 November 1942 – 28 March 2008) was a Marshallese politician. He was the Minister of Justice from 1985 to 1987. He served as the acting President of the Marshall Islands from 20 December 1996 to 14 January 1997. He assumed office upon the death of the previous President, Amata Kabua, having previously served as the country's Minister of Transportation and Communications.

Lemari was of Japanese descent from his maternal grandfather, and was survived by brothers Rellong Lemari (Senator from Lae Atoll) and Johnny Lemari (Mayor of Kwajalein Atoll); wife, Christina Lemari; Imata Kabua; sons Harald (Joanne), Wesley (Lynn), Ranni and Dixon Lemari; daughters Evangeline (Quincy Calep), Dianne, Kimberlynn (Michael Vredenburg), and Lyla; numerous nephews, nieces, grandchildren and great-grandchildren.

On 28 March 2008, Lemari died in Majuro due to complications from diabetes.

References 

1942 births
2008 deaths
Presidents of the Marshall Islands 
Marshallese politicians of Japanese descent
Deaths from diabetes
People from the Ralik Chain
Aelon̄ Kein Ad politicians
Communication ministers of the Marshall Islands
Justice ministers of the Marshall Islands
Transport ministers of the Marshall Islands